The Ghost Rider is a 1943 American Western film directed by Wallace Fox and written by Adele Buffington. This is the first film in the "Marshal Nevada Jack McKenzie" series, and stars Johnny Mack Brown as Jack McKenzie and Raymond Hatton as his sidekick Sandy Hopkins, with Harry Woods, Beverly Boyd, Tom Seidel and Edmund Cobb. The film was released on April 2, 1943, by Monogram Pictures.

Plot

Cast          
Johnny Mack Brown as Nevada Jack McKenzie
Raymond Hatton as Marshal Sandy Hopkins
Harry Woods as Lash Edwards
Beverly Boyd as Julie Wilson
Tom Seidel as Joe McNally
Edmund Cobb as Zach Saddler
Bud Osborne as Lucky Howard 
George DeNormand as Red 
Bill Hunter as Jess 
Artie Ortego as Roy Kern
Charles King as Steve Cook
Milburn Morante as John Wilson 
Bill Nestell as Bill 
Jack Daley as Patrick McNally
Horace B. Carpenter as Talkative Old-Timer 
Ray Miller as Scudder

See also
The Nevada Jack McKenzie series 
 The Ghost Rider (1943)
 The Stranger from Pecos (1943)
 Six Gun Gospel (1943)
 Outlaws of Stampede Pass (1943) 
 The Texas Kid (1943) 
 Raiders of the Border (1944) 
 Partners of the Trail (1944) 
 Law Men (1944) 
 Range Law (1944) 
 West of the Rio Grande (1944) 
 Land of the Outlaws (1944) 
 Law of the Valley (1944) 
 Ghost Guns (1944) 
 The Navajo Trail (1945) 
 Gun Smoke (1945) 
 Stranger from Santa Fe (1945) 
 The Lost Trail (1945) 
 Frontier Feud (1945) 
 Border Bandits (1946) 
 The Haunted Mine (1946)

References

External links
 

1943 films
American Western (genre) films
1943 Western (genre) films
Monogram Pictures films
Films directed by Wallace Fox
American black-and-white films
1940s English-language films
1940s American films